The 2018 season is the 89rd season of the Liga Melaka, which is a Malaysian football competition featuring semi-professional and amateur clubs from Malaccca.UtEM FC are the defending champions.

Teams
For 2018 season, there are 51 teams will compete in the league. Top team from the Division 1 will promoted to Malaysia M4 League for 2019 season.

Division 1

Division 2

Division 3

Group A

Group B

Group C

Group D

Knock-out stage

Bracket

Quarter-finals

Semi-finals

Final

References

External links
 Official website

4
Malay